Nestor Morales Stadium is a baseball stadium in Humacao, Puerto Rico.  The stadium, located at the Osvaldo Gil Bosch sports complex, is also used for soccer by the Grises de Humacao double A baseball team and the Tornados de Humacao who play in the Puerto Rico Soccer League.

Nestor Morales Stadium of Humacao, Puerto Rico, was the site where Alejandro García Padilla announced his candidacy for the Puerto Rico governorship for the 2012 elections.

1987 establishments in Puerto Rico
Baseball venues in Puerto Rico
Football venues in Puerto Rico
Humacao, Puerto Rico